The Battle of Mutina was fought in 193 BC, near Mutina, between the Roman Republic and the Boii. The Roman army won the battle. The battle marked the total defeat of the Boian Gauls, but since consul Lucius Cornelius Merula's victory cost the Romans dear, and his officers accused him of negligence on his march to Mutina, the Senate refused him a triumph on his return to Rome. The Battle of Mutina is described by the Roman historian Livy at 35.4-6.

References

193 BC
190s BC conflicts
2nd century BC in the Roman Republic
Battles involving the Roman Republic
Battles in Emilia-Romagna
History of Modena
Battles involving the Gauls